Marengo is a town in and the county seat of Iowa County, Iowa, United States. It has served as the county seat since August 1845, even though it was not incorporated until July 1859. The population was 2,435 in the 2020 census, a decline from 2,535 in 2000.

History
Marengo was laid out in 1845 and platted in 1847. The city's name commemorates the Battle of Marengo, where Napoleon defeated the Austrian army.

The Iowa County Courthouse, built in 1893, is on the National Register of Historic Places.

Underground Railroad
In 1859, abolitionist John Brown led a group of escaped slaves from Missouri to Michigan.  On February 20, the group stayed at the Draper B. Reynolds Farm 1.5 miles south of Marengo.

Geography

The Iowa River passes north of town.

Demographics

2010 census
As of the census of 2010, there were 2,528 people, 1,059 households, and 648 families living in the city. The racial makeup of the city was 97.3% White, 0.6% African American, 0.6% Native American, 0.4% Asian, 0.4% from other races, and 0.7% from two or more races. Hispanic or Latino of any race were 2.8% of the population.

There were 1,059 households, of which 30.5% had children under the age of 18 living with them, 45.2% were married couples living together, 10.3% had a female householder with no husband present, 5.7% had a male householder with no wife present, and 38.8% were non-families. 34.4% of all households were made up of individuals, and 17.2% had someone living alone who was 65 years of age or older. The average household size was 2.31 and the average family size was 2.94.

The median age in the city was 41 years. 24.9% of residents were under the age of 18; 6.9% were between the ages of 18 and 24; 24% were from 25 to 44; 26.2% were from 45 to 64; and 18.1% were 65 years of age or older. The gender makeup of the city was 47.9% male and 52.1% female.

2000 census
As of the census of 2000, there were 2,535 people, 1,057 households, and 658 families living in the city. The racial makeup of the city was 98.11% White, 0.28% African American, 0.04% Native American, 0.67% Asian, 0.28% from other races, and 0.63% from two or more races. Hispanic or Latino of any race were 1.14% of the population.

There were 1,057 households, out of which 30.4% had children under the age of 18 living with them, 48.9% were married couples living together, 9.5% had a female householder with no husband present, and 37.7% were non-families. 32.9% of all households were made up of individuals, and 16.5% had someone living alone who was 65 years of age or older. The average household size was 2.32 and the average family size was 2.98.

Age spread: 25.4% under the age of 18, 6.9% from 18 to 24, 27.5% from 25 to 44, 21.5% from 45 to 64, and 18.7% who were 65 years of age or older. The median age was 38 years. For every 100 females, there were 88.9 males. For every 100 females age 18 and over, there were 85.5 males.

The median income for a household in the city was $36,509, and the median income for a family was $47,153. Males had a median income of $32,986 versus $21,401 for females. The per capita income for the city was $17,425. About 6.1% of families and 7.3% of the population were below the poverty line, including 6.5% of those under age 18 and 11.9% of those age 65 or over.

Arts and culture

Library

The Marengo Public Library is a Carnegie library, constructed in 1904–1905.  Marengo is believed to be the smallest town in the United States to have received a donation from Andrew Carnegie for the construction of a library. The Library completed a renovation and addition in May 2007.

Pioneer Heritage Museum 
The Iowa County Historical Society operates the Pioneer Heritage Museum, located at 675 East South St., Marengo.  The museum houses two log cabins and a farmhouse, relocated from other sites in the area; and displays of farm implements, household artifacts, clothing and military history items from local residents.  It has a Chicago Rock Island RR depot relocated from Victor, Iowa and a 1930s filling station relocated from Hartwick, Iowa.

Rolle Bolle Courts 
Marengo's Rolle Bolle courts are located at the intersection of Marengo Avenue and E May Street, Marengo. The traditional yard game (known as krulbollen in Belgium) was brought to the area by Belgian immigrants in the late 19th and early 20th centuries. It is played by many local residents as well as by people in the neighboring towns of Victor, Clutier, Belle Plaine, Ladora, and Blairstown.

Education 
Local public schools in Marengo include Iowa Valley Elementary School and Iowa Valley Junior Senior High School, part of the Iowa Valley Community School District. The Iowa Valley Junior High and High School teams are the Tigers.

The Iowa Valley Tigers were the dominant 1985 State Champions in Track and Field for Class 2A, winning 45 points over the second place team's 31.50. This included Matt Zuber's Class 2A records in the long jump (24'-3") and the 110 meter high hurdles (14.1 sec).

Notable people

Cliff Clevenger was a U.S. Representative from Ohio who had a business in Marengo
Travis Fiser, American high school wrestling coach, former collegiate wrestler, and a member of the National Wrestling Hall of Fame.
Cindy Gerard, award-winning romance author, lives outside Marengo.
Paul Hinrichs, born in Marengo, was a relief pitcher in Major League Baseball,
Bradley Kasal, born in Marengo, is a Sergeant Major in the U.S. Marine Corps and recipient of the Navy Cross
Del Miller, born in Marengo, is a college football coach, formerly head coach at Missouri State
Jeremiah Henry Murphy practiced law in Marengo and was later a U.S. representative
John N. W. Rumple, a U.S. representative, served as Mayor and in other capacities
Jarrod Uthoff, professional basketball player, formerly with the Dallas Mavericks and player at University of Iowa. 
Rick Wanamaker, Pan-American Games gold medallist and national champion in decathlon was born in Marengo, and attended high school in Marengo
Mildred Mott Wedel (1912–1995), scholar of Great Plains archaeology and ethnohistory, born in Marengo.
Clarence Whitehill, born in Marengo, was a popular opera singer

See also

Iowa County Courthouse

References

External links

City website
Iowa Valley Community Schools
Iowa County Fair
Marengo Public Library
City-Data Comprehensive statistical data and more about Marengo

Cities in Iowa
Cities in Iowa County, Iowa
County seats in Iowa
Populated places established in 1845
1845 establishments in Iowa Territory